Madanolsavam is a 1978 Indian Malayalam-language romantic drama film written and directed by N. Sankaran Nair and starring Kamal Haasan, Jayan and Zarina Wahab. Dialogues and comedy scenes were written by Thoppil Bhasi. The film was partially remade in Telugu-language as Amara Prema by T. Rama Rao with Kamal and Zarina reprising their roles from the original. The film was dubbed into Tamil as Paruva Mazhai and into Hindi as Dil Ka Sathi Dil. The film is an unofficial remake of an English movie named Love story (1970).

Cast 
 Kamal Haasan as Raju
 Jayan as Dr. Jayakrishnan
 Zarina Wahab as Elizabeth
 Thikkurissy Sukumaran Nair as Ambadi Rajasekharan Thampi
 Sankaradi as D'Cruz
 Meena as Mariyamma
 Adoor Bhasi as Frederick March
 Prathapachandran as Dr. Radhakrishnan
 Mallika Sukumaran as Rajasekharan Thampi's wife
 Sreelatha Namboothiri
 Kottayam Santha
 P. K. Abraham
 Pattom Sadan
 Usharani

Production 
Madanolsavam was directed by N. Sankaran Nair, produced by R. M. Subbiah under production banner R.M.S. Pictures. The film dialogue written by Thoppil Bhasi. It was the first Malayalam film of Zarina Wahab, she played Kamal's wife.

Soundtrack 

The soundtrack album and background score for Madanolsavam were composed by Salil Chowdhury with Malayalam lyrics by O. N. V. Kurup.

This movie was dubbed to Hindi as Dil Ka Sathi Dil, Hindi lyrics written by Madhukar.

This movie was dubbed to Tamil as Paruva Mazhai, Tamil lyrics written by Kannadasan.

The partially remade (and remained dubbed) Telugu version featured 4 songs which were sung by S. P. Balasubrahmanyam & P. Susheela.

Release and reception 
Madanolsavam was released on 26 January 1978. This film was given an "U" (Unrestricted) certificate by the Central Board of Film Certification. At the Kerala State Film Awards 1977–78, O. N. V. Kurup won in the Best Lyricist, and S. Janaki in Best Female Playback Singer.

Other versions 
Madanolsavam was remade in Telugu as Amara Prema by T. Rama Rao with Kamal and Zarina reprising their roles from the original. Actress Savitri acted Telugu version. Only a few scenes in the film Amara Prema were remade and most of the scenes dubbed from the original version of the Madanolsavam. Amara Prema was released on 1 July 1978.

Madanolsavam was dubbed into Tamil as Paruva Mazhai released on 14 April 1978, and into Hindi as Dil Ka Sathi Dil released on 1982.

References

External links 
 
 

1970s Malayalam-language films
1978 films
1978 romantic drama films
Films directed by N. Sankaran Nair
Films scored by Salil Chowdhury
Indian romantic drama films
Malayalam films remade in other languages